Gérard Faetibolt (born 23 March 1932) is a French water polo player. He competed in the men's tournament at the 1960 Summer Olympics.

See also
 France men's Olympic water polo team records and statistics
 List of men's Olympic water polo tournament goalkeepers

References

External links
 

1932 births
Living people
French male water polo players
Water polo goalkeepers
Olympic water polo players of France
Water polo players at the 1960 Summer Olympics
Sportspeople from Colmar